Piletocera batjianalis is a moth in the family Crambidae. It was described by Strand in 1920. It is found in Indonesia, where it has been recorded from the Maluku Islands (Batjan).

References

B
Endemic fauna of Indonesia
Moths of Indonesia
Moths described in 1920